WDRW-LP (107.9 FM) is a Christian radio station licensed to serve the community of Athens, Georgia. The station is owned by Christian Pursuers' Radio, Inc. It airs a religious radio format.

The station was assigned the WDRW-LP call letters by the Federal Communications Commission on September 29, 2004.

References

External links
 Official Website
 

DRW-LP
Radio stations established in 2005
2004 establishments in Georgia (U.S. state)
Radio stations in Athens, Georgia
DRW-LP